CKYQ-FM is a Canadian radio station, broadcasting at 95.7 FM in Plessisville, Quebec. Owned by Arsenal Media, the station airs a Country format branded as Hit Country.

History
The station was launched in 1972 by François Labbé, and aired on 1420 AM with the call sign CKTL as part of the Réseau des Appalaches. It was a private affiliate of Radio-Canada until 1979, when it reaffiliated with the Telemedia Radio Network.

The station was sold to 176100 Canada Inc. in 1991, and converted to FM in 1996. The station would later be sold to Attraction Radio in 2013.

Rebroadcasters

References

External links
KYQ FM
 

Kyq
Kyq
Kyq
Radio stations established in 1972
1972 establishments in Quebec